Get Ed is a computer-animated television series about a genetically engineered teenage delivery boy who fights industrial crime in Progress City.

The show aired as a part of the Jetix programming block on the United States cable television network Toon Disney until the channel closed in 2009. The series also used to run on ABC Family before the channel switched to a non-animated format. Reruns aired on Toon Disney's successor, Disney XD in 2009. It was the second original show produced for the Jetix block and for the Jetix channels worldwide, where the show aired in 2005.

Plot
In the series, Ed is an "electro-genetically" enhanced teen who works for Dojo Deliveries, a courier service, in the futuristic Progress City. Ed uses his cyber sleuthing skills to thwart identity theft and other information-based crimes. He and his courier pals Burn, Deets, Fizz, and Loogie (accompanied by his puppet Dr. Pinch), along with their friend and mentor Ol’ Skool, must battle the ultimate evil – Simon Bedlam, an industrialist who has taken over a significant portion of Progress City, employing stealing from, data mining, or outright destroying his competitors.

Characters

Dojo Deliveries
 Ed, the Protector (voiced by Lyon Smith) - A genetically engineered teen made from the instructions of an ancient alien artifact found by Ol' Skool.  As he tries to uncover his origins, he also works on the Dojo crew as a delivery boy. On top of delivering packages and figuring out his identity, Ed's side job is fighting evil. He has much equipment that he finds along his journey whose technology is far beyond the technology of Progress City, thought to be gifts from aliens for his use. Due to being created as a teenager, he lacks a lot of life experience and can be a little dense and gullible sometimes, but sometimes he gets flashes of future events that help him and his friends. His vehicle is an AI co-piloted hoverboard. His symbol is "The Protector." Sometimes, his eyes glow red when he becomes angry.

 Burn, the Warrior (voiced by L. Dean Ifill) - The unofficial leader of the Dojo who takes pride in being the best of the Dojo group, but with the arrival of Ed, he feels his role in the group has been challenged. Because of this, he is hard on Ed every chance he gets but as the series progresses he starts to warm up to Ed. Although he is still hard on Ed now and again, he cares for him deep down. He also hates a lot of other courier teams. His vehicle is a flaming one-wheeled motorcycle. His symbol is "The Warrior."

 Deets, the Dreamer (voiced by Megan Fahlenbock) - A former teen computer programmer-in-training originally named Sarah, who was forced to work for Bedlam because he captured her parents (also computer programmers), but Ol' Skool helped her save them and offered a place in the Dojo. She appears to have a crush on Ed, yet these feelings appear to be mutual. Her vehicle is a hand-held jet glider pack. Her symbol is "The Dreamer."

 Fizz, the Builder (voiced by Bailey Stocker) - A very smart girl in her early teens who is most handy when it comes to technology, planning, and building new equipment for the Dojo. Her quick thinking saves the crew constantly. Her vehicle is a flying scooter. Her symbol is "The Builder."

 Loogie, the Joker (voiced by Peter Cugno) - A wacky teen comedian with a catfish puppet named  Dr. Pinch on his left hand, which has a bizarre alter-personality that constantly criticizes its owner. His vehicle is a pair of rocket-powered in-line skates. His symbol is "The Joker."

 Anthony "Ol' Skool", the Teacher (voiced by Tony Daniels) - The older and knowledgeable leader of the Dojo, whose wisdom centers within the ways of delivery, among other things. He is only known as Ol' Skool by his friends. He built Ed from an artifact he found in a warehouse and constantly says he knows more about Ed than he does. He uses a normal skateboard, making him the only one who rides a vehicle that is not technologically advanced. He used to work with Simon Bedlam until Bedlam betrayed him. He also used to work for another delivery service called Bolt until someone made a book of procedures and they slowly dropped in the courier ranks.

 Torch (voiced by Tony Daniels) - An A.I. represented as a little floating fireball hologram with a face, who was found by Ed in one of Bedlam's older labs that were about to be destroyed. Ed saved Torch from the lab by downloading him, but he only had time to download his core personality. He can show Ed maps of the city and give Ed instructions on how to get to places more quickly.

Villains
 Mr. Bedlam (voiced by Jamie Watson) - A greedy bureaucrat determined to take control of Progress City, who continues to seek the information he desires. He and Ol' Skool were once business partners until Bedlam cheated him out and took the business all for himself, leaving Ol' Skool with nothing. Ol' Skool went on to start the Dojo. Most of Bedlam's interests, however, have changed to focus more on Ed's connection to certain alien artifacts. Bedlam leads armies of DNA clones, short clowns, rude Twilighters, and different robots. He has been collecting certain items, as well as Ed's DNA as a means of changing his genetic signature to match Ed's.

 Kora (voiced by Jennifer Dale) - Bedlam's personal A.I. construct, who exists within the computer of Bedlam's lair as his digital assistant, and only appears as a golden hologram of a female's upper torso. She is cunning and brilliant to boot, sometimes making better schemes than Bedlam himself comes up with, but Bedlam still treats her like any other servant.

 Crouch (voiced by Tony Rosato) - Bedlam's robot CEO with a toaster for a head. Although not very well built (mainly because the company that made him and his family went out of business), he is also not a very smart robot, constantly acting immature and fears Bedlam's wrath above all else. Because of his incompetence and goofball antics, he is met with the wrath and mocking of Bedlam very often. After being asked by Kora as to why he keeps him around, Bedlam states "I need the toast".
 Crumbelina - Crouch's robot wife who looks more like Crouch in a dress and a wig. Originally a computer simulation, she later appeared in the real world.

 Spyker (voiced by Lorne Kennedy) - A powerful Terminator-like flight and combat robot created by Bedlam to capture Ed.

 Omnirex - A large Tyrannosaurus. One Omnirex is owned by Bedlam.

 DNA Deliveries (voiced by James Rankin) - An agency of regenerating mailman clones that serve as a network of couriers under Bedlam's empire. They turn to slime upon defeat.

 Hoopbots - Robotic soldiers that serve under Bedlam's empire.

Recurring characters
 DJ Dive (voiced by Heather Bambrick) - A radio show host that knows everything going on in the city, even broadcasting Bedlam's moves during his attempted takeover. Her voice is similar to that of the caretaker.

 Dirk Cheap (voiced by Jeff Lumby) - The sole employee of 'Dirk Cheap Deliveries', who reports to his mother, who insists that he address her as 'Dispatcher'.

 Zero - A robot created by Crouch under Bedlam's orders who suffered a failure that brought him his own consciousness. After that, he becomes a friend for Ed and the Dojo.

 Carni-Gizmo - 

 Dr. Hong (voiced by Steve McHattie) - An elderly cyborg scientist with control over nonobots who was sent back in time by the future Bedlam to destroy Ed. He is feared by many citizens in Progress City due to his appearance, home, and experiments.

 Buster and Pit (voiced by Don Dickinson) - Two trash robots seen around almost every episode. In episode 17 ("Trashed"), Buster and Pit are two of the many robots who go on strike and stop working. To keep trash from piling up, the mayor has asked couriers to start hauling trash, credit per pound. When it was discovered that Bedlam has been stealing info from the trash, Ed, who has a new appreciation of trash robots, asks for their help.

 Rodney (voiced by Don Franks) - Ol'Skool's monk sensei, who always nicknames him "hot dog".

 The Caretaker (voiced by Heather Bambrick) - She protects the Machine and is responsible for hiding the alien objects in Progress City many years ago. The Caretaker secretly brings Ol'Skool instructions to create Ed because he will save both worlds (the Earth and the Caretaker's home planet).

Production
Production was underway in March 2005, when the series was announced. The series was created by Andy Knight, and produced by his Toronto-based Red Rover Studios in association with Walt Disney Television Animation.

Knight's other creations included Ned's Newt and Pig City, and Get Ed was his third and final creation before he died in 2008 of a stroke. Get Ed was also credited as the first fully produced computer-animated television series made for Disney, outside of Playhouse Disney's Higglytown Heroes (which was co-produced with WildBrain Entertainment, under Happy Nest).

Episodes

Awards
The show's opening theme music, by Amin Bhatia and Ari Posner, was nominated for the 2006 Primetime Emmy Award for Outstanding Main Title Theme Music.

References

External links
 

2000s American animated television series
2000s Canadian animated television series
2000s American science fiction television series
2000s Canadian science fiction television series
2005 American television series debuts
2005 Canadian television series debuts
2006 American television series endings
2006 Canadian television series endings
American children's animated science fantasy television series
American children's animated superhero television series
American computer-animated television series
Canadian children's animated science fantasy television series
Canadian children's animated superhero television series
Canadian computer-animated television series
Jetix original programming
Television series by Disney
Television series by Disney Television Animation
English-language television shows
Computer-animated television series
Television series set in the future
Fictional postal workers
Teen animated television series
Teen superhero television series
Television shows filmed in Toronto